This is a list of notable bands and musicians who performed primarily rocksteady music for a significant portion of their careers.

Bobby Aitken
Roland Alphonso
Gladstone Anderson
Bob Andy
Ken Boothe
The Cables
Cornel Campbell
Carlton and The Shoes
Lloyd Charmers
The Clarendonians
Phyllis Dillon
Dobby Dobson
Errol Dunkley
Clancy Eccles
Alton Ellis
The Ethiopians
The Gaylads
The Gladiators
Winston Grennan
Marcia Griffiths
Derrick Harriott
The Heptones
Justin Hinds
John Holt
The Jamaicans
Winston Jarrett
Keith & Tex
Pat Kelly
Hopeton Lewis
Mad Caddies
David Madden
Tommy McCook
Freddie McKay
The Melodians
Jackie Mittoo
Derrick Morgan
The Paragons
Ken Parker
Dawn Penn
Dwight Pinkney
The Pioneers
Prince Buster
Ernest Ranglin
Jimmy Riley
Winston Riley
B.B. Seaton
Roy Shirley
The Silvertones
The Slackers
Slim Smith
Lynn Taitt
The Techniques
The Tennors
U-Roy
The Uniques
The Wailers
Delroy Wilson

Rocksteady